Adenza Group, Inc. (formerly known as Calypso Technology, Inc.) is a software application provider specializing in Capital Markets, Investment Management, Central Banking, Risk Management, Clearing, Collateral and Treasury & Liquidity. Their integrated suite of trading and risk applications is used by banks and other financial companies.

Headquartered in San Francisco, Calypso was founded in 1997 by Charles Marston and Kishore Bopardikar and acquired by PE firms Bridgepoint and Summit Partners in June 2016. The company has over 20 offices in 18 countries.

Calypso's software is written entirely in Java and serves front office, middle office, and back office functions, allowing financial institutions to consolidate their infrastructure on a single platform. Their flagship product, Bank-in-a-Box, bundles the software with a Target Operating Model for the processing of all asset classes, as well as pre-configured business workflows and market best practices. In July 2017, Calypso completed the acquisition of a minority stake in Sernova Financial.

References

Financial software companies
Companies based in San Francisco
2021 mergers and acquisitions